Homalodotherium is an extinct genus of notoungulate mammals native to South America. Fossils of Homalodotherium have been found in the Middle Miocene (Friasian in the SALMA classification) Santa Cruz Formation of Argentina and the Río Frías Formation of Chile.

Description 

It walked on the soles of its hind feet and the toes of its front feet, which would have made the animal higher at the shoulder than at the hips when it walked on all fours. It was probably at least partially bipedal, being able to pull down tree branches with its arms while rearing up on its hind legs. Various other prehistoric and living creatures have also developed this anatomical design and feeding style; examples are the chalicotheres, ground sloths (which shared the same environments), the giant panda, the gorilla and, possibly, the therizinosaur dinosaurs.

References

Further reading 
 Scott, William B. 1928. Mammalia of the Santa Cruz beds. Astrapotheria. Reports of the Princeton University Expeditions to Patagonia, 1896–1899. 6 (4): 301-342

Toxodonts
Clawed herbivores
Burdigalian life
Langhian life
Miocene mammals of South America
Friasian
Neogene Argentina
Fossils of Argentina
Neogene Chile
Fossils of Chile
Fossil taxa described in 1870
Taxa named by Thomas Henry Huxley
Prehistoric placental genera
Austral or Magallanes Basin
Santa Cruz Formation